NGC 2244 (also known as Caldwell 50 or the Satellite Cluster) is an open cluster in the Rosette Nebula, which is located in the constellation Monoceros. This cluster has several O-type stars, super hot stars that generate large amounts of radiation and stellar wind.

The age of this cluster has been estimated to be less than 5 million years. The brightest star in the cluster is 12 Monocerotis, a foreground K-class giant. The two brightest members of the cluster are HD 46223 of spectral class O4V, 400,000 times brighter than the Sun, and approximately 50 times more massive, and HD 46150, whose spectral type is O5V, has a luminosity 450,000 time larger than that of our star, and is up to 60 times more massive, but it may actually be a double star.

References

External links

NASA – photo and information on NGC 2244
Spitzer Space Telescope site – Photo of NGC 2244

 SEDS – NGC 2244

Open clusters
Monoceros (constellation)
2244
050b